Sufi Kani (also Romanized as Şūfī Kānī; also known as  Şūfī Kānūn and Sūfī Kānūn) is a village in Beradust Rural District, Sumay-ye Beradust District, Urmia County, West Azerbaijan Province, Iran. At the 2006 census, its population was 132, in 22 families.

References 

Populated places in Urmia County